Bernardo Bobić (Bubich, Budich) (died c. 1695, in Zagreb) was a Croatian baroque painter and gilder. He was mainly active in Zagreb and the surrounding areas.

Works

References

External links
https://web.archive.org/web/20130927152052/http://www.give-me-art.com/bernando-bobic-prvi-hrvatski-impresionst-zagreb/
http://www.discoverbaroqueart.org/database_item.php?id=monument;BAR;hr;Mon11;25;en
http://enciklopedija.lzmk.hr/clanak.aspx?id=44750

Artists from Zagreb
Croatian painters
17th-century Croatian people
17th-century painters